= Ammonium hexachlorotellurate =

Ammonium Hexachlorotellurate(IV)
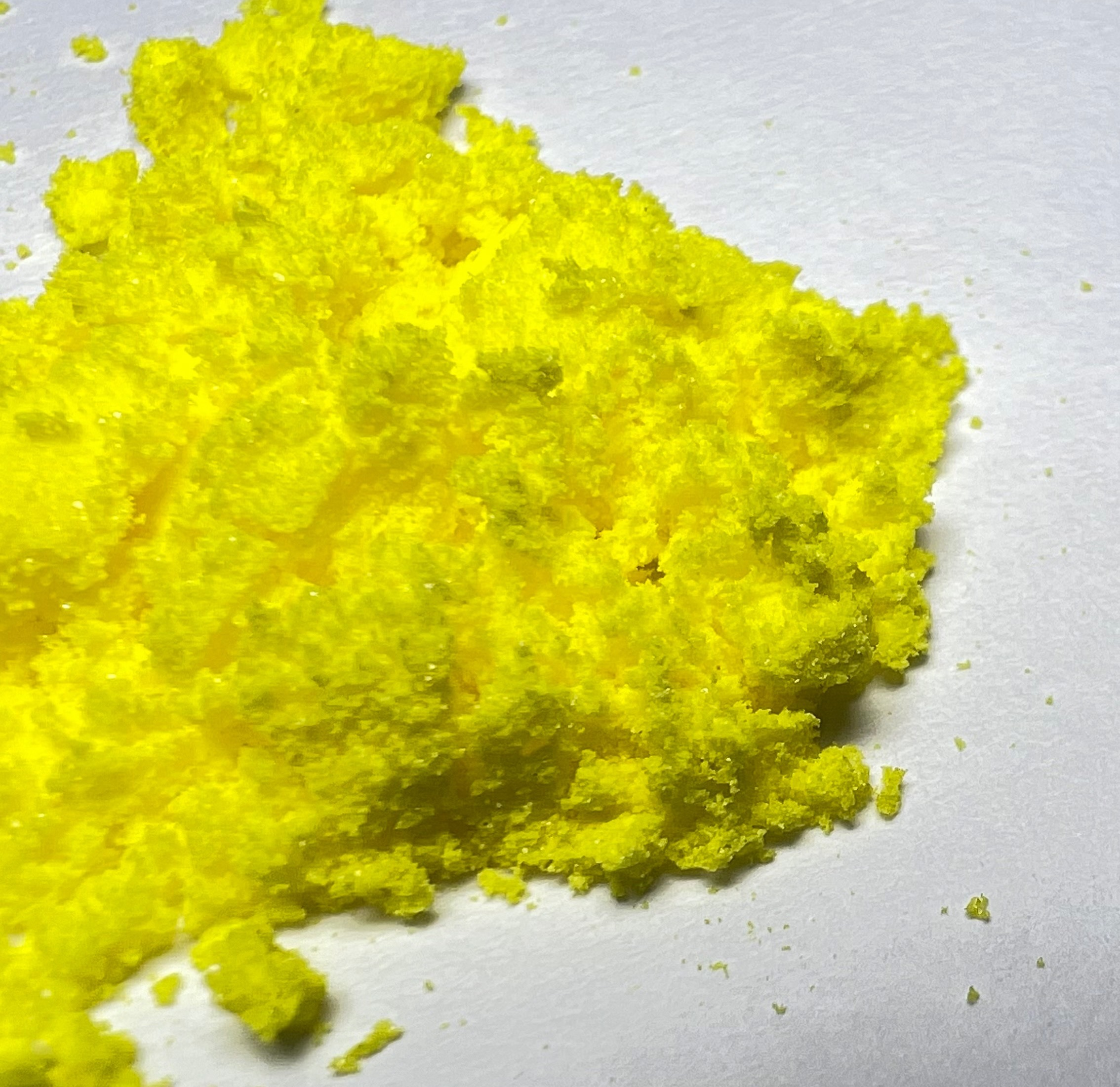

Names
- IUPAC name Ammonium hexachlorotellurate(IV)
- Other names Diammonium hexachlorotellurate

Identifiers
CAS Number	16893-14-4
3D model (JSmol)	Interactive image
ChemSpider	21170176
EC Number	240-931-1
PubChem CID	71310233
CompTox Dashboard (EPA)	DTXSID80937567
- InChI: InChI=1S/Cl4Te.2ClH.2H3N/c1-5(2,3)4;;;;/h;2*1H;2*1H3 Key: PLVTVUGZXAOGKX-UHFFFAOYSA-N
- SMILES: [NH4+].[NH4+].Cl[Te](Cl)(Cl)([Cl-])([Cl-])Cl

Properties
Chemical formula	[NH_{4}]_{2}[TeCl_{6}]
Molar mass	376.38 g·mol^{−1}
Appearance	Yellow crystals
- Except where otherwise noted, data are given for materials in their standard state (at 25 °C [77 °F], 100 kPa). Infobox references

Ammonium hexachlorotellurate is an inorganic chemical compound with the chemical formula [NH_{4}]_{2}[TeCl_{6}].

== Physical properties ==
The compound forms yellow octahedral crystals about 0.1 mm (0.0039 in) diameter, decomposes gradually in air. The compound contains the ammonium cations [NH_{4}]^{+} and hexachlorotellurate(IV) anions [TeCl_{6}]^{2−}.
